"My Wife" is a song by the British rock band the Who, written and sung by bass guitarist John Entwistle. It was originally released in 1971 on Who's Next and later as the B-side of the single "Baba O'Riley" on 6 November 1971 in Europe by Polydor Records.

Background
"My Wife" was the fourth track on Who's Next and was recorded at Olympic Studios sometime in May 1971.  While it did appear on Who's Next it was thought that it was not a part of the Lifehouse project which was confirmed in 2000, when it was not included in Pete Townshend's Lifehouse Chronicles box set.

Song structure
"My Wife" is  arguably John Entwistle's highlight on Who's Next being that he takes on the lead vocals, bass guitar, piano, and horn section. Unusually, this song does not feature a guitar solo, which is most likely because Entwistle could only "write on bass guitar or in my head, just transfer it to manuscript paper, or piano," and did not play the guitar. Instead of a guitar solo, in the longer breaks between verses there is a horn part by Entwistle. This song is in the key of B major.

Personnel
The Who
Pete Townshend – guitar
John Entwistle – lead vocals, bass guitar, piano, brass
Keith Moon – drums

The Kids Are Alright soundtrack version

In 1979 "My Wife" was again released as a B-side single, this time to "Long Live Rock". This version was recorded live and released on The Kids Are Alright. What is rare about this version is that it was the only song released from The Who's 1977 concert at the Kilburn State Theatre in London. The rest of the songs were not released until 2008 on the DVD The Who at Kilburn: 1977. The song is unlike the studio version as it has a guitar solo by Townshend but no piano or horns.

Live and compilation appearances
The song was performed first on the Who's Next Tour and quickly became a live staple until Entwistle's death in 2002. It is featured on the following live and compilation albums by the Who:
Two's Missing
Blues to the Bush
The Who Live at the Royal Albert Hall
View from a Backstage Pass
Who's Greatest Hits
Thirty Years of Maximum R&B
The Ultimate Collection

John Entwistle solo versions
In November 1972, Entwistle re-recorded the song and released it on his third solo album Rigor Mortis Sets In. A live version of the song was featured on the two-disc compilation album So Who's the Bass Player? The Ox Anthology which was released on 22 March 2005.

Reception
During an interview Pete Townshend described "My Wife" as "the best new rock number on the album [Who's Next]." Critic Mark Deming called "My Wife" the "comic relief" on "Who's Next". Rob Mitchum of Pitchfork Media called it "the only listenable song of [Entwistle's] writing career."

Because of excessive live performances John Entwistle wrote "The Quiet One" to replace this song, although he would still perform the song for his solo career and his later performances with The Who.

In 2016, Rolling Stone ranked the song number 21 on its list of the 50 greatest songs by The Who.

See also
"Heaven and Hell"
"Boris the Spider"
"The Ox"

References

The Who songs
Songs written by John Entwistle
1971 singles
1979 singles
Black comedy music
Decca Records singles
Songs about alcohol
Songs about marriage
Song recordings produced by Glyn Johns
Song recordings produced by Pete Townshend
1971 songs